The 2020–21 Eredivisie match between VVV-Venlo and Ajax at De Koel, Venlo, took place on Saturday, 24 October 2020. Ajax won the match 13–0, setting a new record for the largest win in the history of the league.  This result beat Ajax's 12–1 win over Vitesse back in the 1971–72 season.

Match

Overview
Jurgen Ekkelenkamp opened the score for Ajax in the 12th minute, with the 2–0 only five minutes later by Lassina Traoré's first goal of the evening. Ajax scored a two more goals before the half-time break, with a second goal by Traoré and a strike from Dušan Tadić.

Venlo were left with 10 men after 52 minutes when Christian Kum was sent off after the video assistant referee changed his yellow card for violent conduct to a red. Venlo further collapsed after the sending off with four Ajax goals in five minutes by Traoré, Antony, Ekkelenkamp and Daley Blind. Traoré added his fourth after 65 minutes, and two goals by Klaas-Jan Huntelaar in the 74th and 76th minute made it to 11–0.<ref name="BBC" / With 12 minutes left, Lisandro Martínez made it 12–0 before Traoré scored his fifth of the game in the 87th minute.

Records
Erik ten Hag's side recorded their biggest victory in club history, beating their own Eredivisie record from 1972 when they thrashed Vitesse 12–1.

Lassina Traoré became the first Ajax player to score five goals in an Eredivisie game since Marco van Basten in 1985 and the first to record three assists for the club in a league match since Frenkie de Jong in 2017. The display meant that Traoré became the first player this century to be directly involved in eight goals in an Eredivisie match.

It was the biggest ever defeat in a professional game for Venlo, with their previous worst performance being a 10–1 loss to PSV Eindhoven in 1964.

Summary

Details

Notes

References

Eredivisie matches
Ajax 2020
VVV-Venlo 2020
2020–21 in Dutch football
Record association football wins